A stove is an appliance that heats or cooks or both, in particular:

 Kitchen stove
 Wood-burning stove 

Stove may also refer to:

People with the surname
 Betty Stöve (born 1945), Dutch tennis player
 David Stove (1927–1994), Australian philosopher
 Johnathan Stove (born 1995), American basketball player 
 R. J. Stove (born 1961), Australian writer, composer and organist

People with the nickname
 Stove King (Steven William King, born 1974), English musician

See also